In geometry, the tetrahexagonal tiling is a uniform tiling of the hyperbolic plane. It has Schläfli symbol r{6,4}.

Constructions 
There are for uniform constructions of this tiling, three of them as constructed by mirror removal from the [6,4] kaleidoscope. Removing the last mirror, [6,4,1+], gives [6,6], (*662). Removing the first mirror [1+,6,4], gives [(4,4,3)], (*443). Removing both mirror as [1+,6,4,1+], leaving [(3,∞,3,∞)] (*3232).

Symmetry 
The dual tiling, called a rhombic tetrahexagonal tiling, with face configuration V4.6.4.6, and represents the fundamental domains of a quadrilateral kaleidoscope, orbifold (*3232), shown here in two different centered views. Adding a 2-fold rotation point in the center of each rhombi represents a (2*32) orbifold.

Related polyhedra and tiling

See also

Square tiling
Tilings of regular polygons
List of uniform planar tilings
List of regular polytopes

References
 John H. Conway, Heidi Burgiel, Chaim Goodman-Strass, The Symmetries of Things 2008,  (Chapter 19, The Hyperbolic Archimedean Tessellations)

External links 

 Hyperbolic and Spherical Tiling Gallery
 KaleidoTile 3: Educational software to create spherical, planar and hyperbolic tilings
 Hyperbolic Planar Tessellations, Don Hatch

Hyperbolic tilings
Isogonal tilings
Isotoxal tilings
Uniform tilings